Joseph E. Woodworth (1837-1889) was a ship builder, merchant, and member of the Woodworth political family.

Life
Joseph was born in 1837 in Nova Scotia, the son of Benjamin B. Woodworth, a Justice of the Peace and important business figure in Kings County, as well as a United Empire Loyalist. He was the brother of Douglas Benjamin Woodworth.

He was educated in Kings County, and began a career as a shipbuilder, constructing the largest vessels in the county at that time. Woodworth eventually moved west, becoming a pioneer of Manitoba after settling in Brandon. There he began a career as a merchant and real-estate broker.

In 1883, he was elected to the Legislative Assembly of Manitoba, representing Brandon in the 5th Legislature. He won that election with 57% of the vote.

Marriage and children
Joseph married Nancy Cox, daughter of Joseph Cox and Mary Bigelow, and had two children:
Abel Woodworth, who became a lawyer in New York City
Benjamin F. Woodworth, who moved to New York City

Namesake
The rural municipality of Woodworth is named after Joseph.

References

1837 births
1889 deaths
Canadian shipbuilders
Joseph E.
Members of the Legislative Assembly of Manitoba